The Irschinger Ach (in its upper course: Kühpicklgraben, in its middle course: Westenhauser Ach) is a river in Bavaria, Germany. It flows into the Wellenbach near Vohburg.

See also
List of rivers of Bavaria

References

Rivers of Bavaria
Rivers of Germany